was a village located in Senboku District, Akita Prefecture, Japan.

In 2003, the village had an estimated population of 5,793 and a density of 21.86 persons per km². The total area was 264.95 km².

On September 20, 2005, Nishiki, along with the towns of Kakunodate and Tazawako (all from Senboku District), was merged to create the city of Semboku.

External links
 City of Semboku official website 

Dissolved municipalities of Akita Prefecture
Semboku, Akita